Drowning in Limbo is a compilation album by the singer-songwriter Lydia Lunch, released in 1989 through Widowspeak Productions. It contains the EPs The Drowning of Lucy Hamilton and In Limbo, neither of which had been previously released on CD.

Track listing

Personnel 
J. G. Thirlwell – remastering, design
Annie Sprinkle – photography

References

External links 
 

1989 compilation albums
Lydia Lunch albums